The Archdeacon of Newark is a senior ecclesiastical officer in the Church of England Diocese of Southwell and Nottingham.

History
The archdeaconry of Newark was created by Order in Council on 11 June 1912 and comprises the northern and eastern parts of Southwell diocese. It is now one of two archdeaconries in that diocese, the other being the Archdeacon of Nottingham.

List of archdeacons
1913–1936 (ret.): Egbert Hacking (afterwards archdeacon emeritus)
1936–1946 (ret.): John Hales
1947–1962 (res.): Francis West
1962–1965 (res.): Kenneth Thompson
1965–1979 (ret.): Brian Woodhams (afterwards archdeacon emeritus)
1980–1991 (res.): David Leaning
1992–1999 (res.): David Hawtin
1999–2011 (res.): Nigel Peyton
25 July 2011 – 19 February 2012 (Acting): Peter Hill, Archdeacon of Nottingham
19 February 20124 February 2020 (res.): David Picken
8 June 2021present: Tors Ramsey

References

 
Church of England lists
Lists of Anglicans
Diocese of Southwell and Nottingham
Anglican ecclesiastical offices
Archdeacon of Newark
Lists of English people